The Spot Pond Archeological District is a historic archaeological site near Spot Pond in Stoneham, Massachusetts.  It is located in the Virginia Woods section of the Middlesex Fells Reservation, a state park.  The district encompasses sites along Spot Pond Brook that were mill sites dating from the 17th to the 19th centuries.  At its height, in the mid-19th century the Hayward Rubber Works was located in the area, giving it the name "Haywardville".  One of the park's trails runs through the area, and a park pamphlet provide a self-guided tour joining the major remnants of the industries that once flourished there.

The district was added to the National Register of Historic Places in 1992.

External links 
 Industrial Eden: The Legacy of Haywardville
 Haywardville Historical Images

See also
National Register of Historic Places listings in Stoneham, Massachusetts
National Register of Historic Places listings in Middlesex County, Massachusetts

References

Historic districts on the National Register of Historic Places in Massachusetts
Stoneham, Massachusetts
National Register of Historic Places in Middlesex County, Massachusetts